Manta, Manta is a 1991 German language action comedy film directed by Wolfgang Büld. The film features Til Schweiger, Tina Ruland, Stefan Gebelhoff, Lena Sabine Berg and Michael Kessler in the lead roles. Singer/songwriter Sylkie Monoff makes a small appearance. It was released in Germany on October 3, 1991 and in Hungary on April 17, 1992. The English title of the film was Racin' in the Street. Four weeks before the film was released Manta – Der Film was shown in theaters, which also focused on Opel Manta in a comedic way, see "Manta jokes".

Actors Til Schweiger, Tina Ruland and Michael Kessler started their film acting career with Manta, Manta.

Plot
In the Ruhr area: Bertie (Til Schweiger) is the proud owner of a well-tuned Manta. Together with his friends Gerd (Stefan Gebelhoff), Klausi (Michael Kessler) and Hakan (Ömer Simsek) he enjoys driving in his Opel Manta as a hobby. One day, while Bertie was driving his car in a peace race against a VW Golf GTI, a Mercedes driver Axel (Martin Armknecht), came up rapidly from behind. While sensible Gerd lets him pass, provocative Hakan chases him and hits his car which slows Axel down, but eventually they all gather at a fast food joint. Axel is offended and furiously shouts "Can you not practice on the hill you idiots?" After a few scuffles and insults from Axel towards Bertie and his friends, Bertie challenges Axel to a race which Axel agrees to only after Bertie stakes the money which he and his girlfriend Uschi have saved to set up their family home. Uschi, who gets angry with Bertie for staking all their money and because she thinks that Bertie pays more attention to his car than her, meets nightclub owner Helmut, who offers her to take part in a beauty contest, which she decides to participate in to make Bertie jealous.

Bertie and his friends start preparing for the race. Klausi, while driving in Gerd's car, which was lent to him temporarily for his birthday, reaches an ice cream joint where he mixes up the gears and his car accidentally hits Helmut. Helmut, embarrassed by this incident, starts chasing Klausi driving in Gerd's car with his Ferrari 328 GTS and Klausi unintentionally ends up sinking Gerd's car in a lake, misdirecting Helmut. Later, with the help of Hakan, they manage to pull the car out of the lake and restore it to working condition. Meanwhile, on the way to Westfalen Stadium, Dortmund, Bertie had damaged the engine of his car by over-revving it despite Gerd's warnings in a street race against a Bavarian BMW 3 Series full of Bayern Munich fans heading for the stadium. They both then push the car to the nearby workshop where Gerd previously worked and was fired from and fit the engine of a parked touring car into Bertie's car. Bertie and Gerd then get to Helmut's nightclub, where Bertie objects to Uschi's participation in the beauty contest. Helmut tells him not to bother Uschi, takes him aside, punches him and bans him from entering his nightclub. Bertie then gets heavily drunk at a fast food joint while listening with Gerd to a radio station broadcasting Manta jokes and later also a secretly taken recording of his explanation of his lifestyle to a radio station intern called Florentine (Lena Sabine Berg). Hearing this, Bertie gets angry and goes to the radio station where he creates a rumpus and consequently the radio station's security guard throws him out, along with Gerd and Florentine. The three then go back to Helmut's nightclub where Bertie happens to encounter Axel. Axel, aware of Bertie's condition, challenges Bertie to race immediately.

Despite his condition, Bertie gets into his Manta and goes to the place where the race is to be held. Meanwhile, Uschi won the beauty contest at Helmut's nightclub and after Gerd warns her that Berti is about to race despite being drunk, she takes Helmut's keys and drives off in his Ferrari to stop Bertie from racing. Uschi arrives and tells Bertie that she is pregnant and will soon give birth to his child and Uschi and Bertie are reunited. Klausi races against Axel in Bertie's place with Bertie's car. While Helmut, who came to collect his Ferrari, furiously leaves the area, Axel comes at him on full throttle and his Mercedes collides with Helmut's Ferrari, ejecting the Mercedes against a lamp post and totally trashing it, enabling Klausi to win the race.

Cast
Til Schweiger as Bertie
Tina Ruland as Uschi
Stefan Gebelhoff as Gerd
Lena Sabine Berg as Florentine
Michael Kessler as Klausi
Ömer Simsek as Hakan
Martin Armknecht as Axel
Nadja Naidenow as Angie
Beatrice Manowski as Sabine
Karin Johnson as Freundin Axel
Uwe Fellensiek as Disco-Besitzer
Jürgen Schornagel as Herr Ecker
Jockel Tschiersch as Radio-DJ
Olaf Ploetz as Vorsitzender Taubenverein
Liz Becker as Berties Mutter
Paul Faßnacht as Berties Vater
Alexander von Eisenhart-Rothe as Axels Freund
Norman Price as GTI-Fahrer
Sepp Schauer as Bayernfan
Horst D. Scheel as Schuldirektor
Werner Karle Jr. as Angestellter Tankstelle
Sylkie Monoff as school girl

Reception
The film received positive reviews and was declared a semi-hit at the German box office. The film was appreciated by film critics for its car stunt scenes. The film became very popular among German youth. The German film database website zweitausendeins called the film a Manta-myth-"oriented film, the compelling ideas, as well as lacking independence of thought." IMDb rated the film 5.4 out of 10.

Soundtrack
The original soundtrack of the film comprised 17 songs.

Sequel
In 2008, rumors of a second part, entitled Manta, Manta 2 were heard for the first time. In 2010 it was first officially mentioned that the producers and director would work on it. They declared that they would begin shooting the sequel on November 11, 2010. Schweiger, who wanted to work in the sequel of the film for a very long time was signed for the sequel, but after the death of Bernd Eichinger in January 2011, the Project Manta, Manta 2 was frozen. As of June 2012 the current status and prospects of realization are unknown.

Miscellaneous
In the television series Pastewka, Michael Kessler is shown urinating in his boots, as a spoof to the film's scenes in which he urinates in his boots.
The title "We drive Manta Manta" that can be heard in the chase scene with Klausi (Michael Kessler) in Gerds Manta and Helmut in his Ferrari, comes from the Berlin punk band King Køng under the pseudonym "Die Motoristen". King Køng broke up in 1993 to favor the re-establishment of Die Ärzte.
Many sequences were shot in Wuppertal, the school scenes were shot in the local high school Gymnasium Sedanstraße in Wuppertal-Barmen.
The title song "Manta! Manta!" Of the film was sung by Jörg Evers under the pseudonym "Manni Ickx".

References

External links
 
 On Filmportal.de
 DVD Forum Review
 Photos

1991 action comedy films
German action comedy films
German auto racing films
1990s German-language films
Films produced by Bernd Eichinger
Films about automobiles
1991 films
1990s German films